

Sigismund-Helmut von Dawans (23 September 1899 – 10 June 1944) was a general in the  during the Second World War and a recipient of the German Cross in Gold on 26 August 1942.

Sigismund-Helmut von Dawans was born on 23 September 1899 in Erfurt. He married Ingeborg Hane on 6 April 1923.

References
Citations

Bibliography

 
 Otto von Knobelsdorff, Geschichte der niedersächsischen 19. Panzer-Division 1939–1945, Podzun, 1958, 312 pages (2nd printing 1988)
 Rolf Hinze, Die 19. Panzer-Division 1939–1945 (Bildband), Podzun-Pallas-Verlag, 1982, 176 pages

External links
 ww2gravestone.com - Dawans, Sigismund Hellmut Konrad Alfred Georg Ritter und Edler von
 ThePeerage.com - Person Page 6,485

1899 births
1944 deaths
Deaths by airstrike during World War II
Major generals of the German Army (Wehrmacht)
German knights
German Army personnel killed in World War II
Recipients of the Gold German Cross
Burials at La Cambe German war cemetery
German Army personnel of World War I
Military personnel from Erfurt
German Army generals of World War II